Prince Yi of the First Rank (hošoi urgun cin wang), or simply Prince Yi, was the title of a princely peerage used in China during the Manchu-led Qing dynasty (1644–1912). It was also one of the 12 "iron-cap" princely peerages in the Qing dynasty, which meant that the title could be passed down without being downgraded.

The first bearer of the title was Yinxiang (1686–1730), the 13th son of the Kangxi Emperor. He was awarded the title by his fourth brother, the Yongzheng Emperor, who succeeded their father. The title was passed down over seven generations, with a brief interruption in 1861. Zaiyuan (1816–1861), the sixth Prince Yi, was ousted from power in the Xinyou Coup of 1861 and forced to commit suicide. Three years later, Zaiyuan's cousin, Zaidun (1827–1890), became the seventh Prince Yi. The title was then passed down for another two generations to Yuqi (1900–1948) before it was finally abolished after the fall of the Qing dynasty.

Members of the Prince Yi peerage

 Yinxiang (1686–1730), the Kangxi Emperor's 13th son, held the title Prince Yi of the First Rank from 1722 to 1730, posthumously honoured as Prince Yixian of the First Rank (怡賢親王)
 Hongxiao (弘曉; 1722–1778), Yinxiang's seventh son, held the title Prince Yi of the First Rank from 1730 to 1778, posthumously honoured as Prince Yixi of the First Rank (怡僖親王)
 Yonglang (永琅; 1746–1799), Hongxiao's second son, held the title of a third class zhenguo jiangjun from 1765 to 1779, held the title Prince Yi of the First Rank from 1779 to 1799, posthumously honoured as Prince Yigong of the First Rank (怡恭親王)
 Mianbiao (綿標; 1770–1799), Yonglang's second son, held the title of a buru bafen fuguo gong from 1790 to 1799, posthumously awarded the title Prince Yi of the First Rank in 1800
 Yixun (奕勳; 1793–1818), Mianbiao's eldest son, held the title of a third class zhenguo jiangjun in 1799, held the title Prince Yi of the First Rank from 1799 to 1818, posthumously honoured as Prince Yike of the First Rank (怡恪親王)
 Zaifang (載坊; 1816–1821), Yixun's eldest son, held the title Prince Yi of the First Rank from 1819 to 1821, had no male heir
 Zaiyuan (1816–1861), Yixun's second son, held the title Prince Yi of the First Rank from 1825 to 1861, stripped of his title and forced to commit suicide in 1861
 Zaiping (載坪), Yixun's third son, held the title of a third class fuguo jiangjun from 1836 to 1841, had no male heir
 Zaiqi (載圻), Yixun's fourth son, held the title of a third class fuguo jiangjun from 1836 to 1869
 Pulun (溥綸), Zaiqi's second son, held the title of a fengguo jiangjun from 1870 to 1872, had no male heir
 Zaizeng (載增), Yixun's fifth son, held the title of a third class fuguo jiangjun from 1836 to 1859
 Puying (溥瑛), Zaizeng's eldest son, held the title of a third class fuguo jiangjun from 1859 to 1891
 Yujun (毓寯), Puying's second son, held the title of a feng'en jiangjun from 1891 to 1905, had no male heir
 Zaikun (載堃), Yixun's sixth son, held the title of a third class fuguo jiangjun from 1838 to 1853, had no male heir
 Zaikan (載堪), Yixun's seventh son, held the title of a third class fuguo jiangjun from 1838 to 1861
 Puyi (溥義), Zaikan's eldest son, held the title of a fengguo jiangjun from 1861 to 1883
 Yuxiu (毓秀), Puyi's eldest son, held the title of a feng'en jiangjun from 1883 to 1887, had no male heir
 Zaitai (載泰; 1838–1878), Yizeng's second son, held the title of a buru bafen fuguo gong from 1862 to 1864, promoted to feng'en fuguo gong in 1864, stripped of his title in 1866
 Yonghang (永杭), Hongxiao's eldest son, held the title of a third class fuguo jiangjun from 1765 to 1777, had no male heir
 Yongmai (永邁), Hongxiao's eighth son, held the title of a third class fuguo jiangjun from 1790 to 1799, had no male heir
 Hongjiao (弘晈; 1713–1764), Yinxiang's fourth son, awarded the title Prince Ning of the Second Rank (寧郡王) in 1730, posthumously honoured as Prince Ningliang of the Second Rank (寧良郡王). The Prince Ning peerage became a separate peerage.
 Yongfu (永福; 1753–1782), Hongjiao's second son, held the title of a beile from 1764 to 1782, posthumously honoured as "Gongke Beile" (恭恪貝勒) in 1782, posthumously promoted to "Prince Yi of the First Rank" in 1864
 Mianyu (綿譽; 1780–1843), Yongfu's fourth son, held the title of a beile from 1782 to 1844, posthumously promoted to "Prince Yi of the First Rank" in 1864
 Yiqu (奕蘧), Mianyu's eldest son, held the title of a second class zhenguo jiangjun from 1821 to 1839, stripped of his title in 1839
 Yige (奕格; 1805–1858), Mianyu's third son, held the title of a beizi from 1844 to 1858, posthumously promoted to "Prince Yi of the First Rank" in 1864
 Zaidun (載敦; 1827–1890), Yige's second son, held the title of a third class zhenguo jiangjun from 1857 to 1858, promoted to feng'en zhenguo gong in 1858, inherited the Prince Yi peerage in 1864 and became "Prince Yi of the First Rank", posthumously honoured as Prince Yiduan of the First Rank (怡端親王)
 Pujing (溥靜; 1849–1900), Zaidun's eldest son, held the title of a buru bafen fuguo gong from 1868 to 1891, held the title Prince Yi of the First Rank from 1891 to 1900, stripped of his title in 1900
 Puyao (溥耀), Zaidun's second son, held the title of a second class zhenguo jiangjun from 1880 to 1900
 Yuqi (毓麒; 1900–1948), Puyao's eldest son, held the title Prince Yi of the First Rank from 1902 to 1945
 Hengshu (恆樞; 1917–1979), Yuqi's son
 Qiyun (啟運; b. 1945), Yuqi's grandson
 Hongchang (弘昌; 1706–1771), Yinxiang's eldest son, held the title of a beizi from 1723 to 1735, promoted to beile in 1735 but had his title revoked in 1739
 Hongdun (弘暾; 1711–1728), Yinxiang's third son, posthumously awarded a beile title in 1728
 Yongxi (永喜), Hongdun's heir, held a beile title from 1730 to 1731, had no male heir
 Hongqin (弘昑; 1716–1729), Yinxiang's sixth son, posthumously awarded a beile title in 1729

Family tree

See also
 Prince Ning
 Royal and noble ranks of the Qing dynasty

References
 

Qing dynasty princely peerages